Dolores: The Truth About the Wanninkhof Case is a 2021 six-part Spanish docuseries about the case of the murder of Rocío Wanninkhof. Produced by Unicorn Content for HBO Max, it was released on 26  October 2021.

Episodes

Release 
Dolores: The Truth About the Wanninkhof Case was released on 26 October 2021 on HBO Max. It is one of the first Spanish original titles of the HBO Max catalogue, which debuted in Europe on 26 October 2021.

References

External links 

Spanish-language television shows
HBO Max original programming
2021 Spanish television series debuts
Spanish documentary television series